Longsands Academy is a co-educational secondary school and sixth form with academy status, located in the town of St. Neots, Cambridgeshire, England. It is one of two St Neots secondary schools that are part of the Astrea Academy Trust, with Ernulf Academy being the other.

History
Longsands Academy was opened in September 1960 as "Longsands School", a secondary modern, under headmaster Harold K Whiting assisted by Deputy Head Mr Denny and Head Mistress Miss K C Flowerdew.  The school's four houses were Rutherford (after Physicist Ernest Rutherford), Britten (after composer Benjamin Britten), Eliot (after poet Thomas Stearns Eliot) and Moore (after sculptor Henry Moore).

When opened the school had four years. The 1st year was streamed into 1E, 1A, 1S, and 1T, 2nd year 2N, 2O, 2R, 2T and 2H, 3rd year 3S, 3O, 3U, 3T, 3H and 4th year 4W, 4E, 4S, 4T.  The use of the letters of the cardinal points of the compass being a way of partially disguising which classes were streamed the highest.  The 5th year was started in 1961 for those pupils staying on beyond school leaving age (then 15) who were taking the GCE at O level.

Subsequently, Longsands became a comprehensive school and acquired a Sixth Form, and was heavily expanded. It was known as "Longsands Community College" until the late 1990s before being shortened to Longsands College. In August 2011 Longsands College was renamed to Longsands Academy, as Longsands became an academy.

Features
The academy accommodates students between the age of 11 and 18. The upper two years are part of the Sixth Form, which is based in a separate self-contained block on site, with lessons being done in the main school.

The school facilities include a sports hall, two gyms, a library, a stage for theatrical productions, an enclosed courtyard, and a large outdoor area including cricket strip and two rugby pitches, as well as a football pitch, long jump pit and all weather floodlit football/hockey pitch. 
 
The school once had a museum located within the building, which closed in 1989 following the death of teacher Granville Rudd, who taught archaeology and museum studies with many of the contents (including an impressive collection of human skulls) later being transferred to St Neots town museum.  The old museum room was used primarily as a classroom until 2003 when it was converted into two classrooms with remaining artefacts being donated to other museums.Media Lab'
The Media Lab was opened in December 2005, some six months after designation of Specialist Status as an Academy with a specialism in Media. Originally a boiler room, it now houses a video editing suite, radio studio facility. The suite is used by other schools in the local community.

Horizon
The Horizon Association was formed in 1992. It contains two schools in England, one in Wales, one in Spain, two in Italy, one in Moscow, two in France, two in Germany and two in the Netherlands. Horizon was formed by Michel Rousseau-Rambaud who was Head of a lycée in Angers in France.

The purpose in forming the organisation was to further the ideal of European citizenship. This is done by organising events at which small numbers of students (mainly Sixth Formers) can travel to a host school who puts on a programme of interest for a week or even up to half a term.

Notable alumni

 John Gregory - England footballer
 Lee Philpott - footballer
 Tommy Martin - boxer. English super lightweight champion
 Robert Grabarz- high jumper. Bronze Medalist at the 2012 London Summer Olympics, and Gold at World's the same year in Helsinki
 Rob Harris - Guitarist of the band Jamiroquai

References

External links
College website

Academies in Cambridgeshire
Secondary schools in Cambridgeshire
St Neots
Educational institutions established in 1960
1960 establishments in England